The first season of the animated television series, Aqua Teen Hunger Force originally aired in the United States. Season one unofficially started on December 30, 2000 with the unannounced early morning stealth airing of "Rabbot" on Cartoon Network. Season one officially began one week after the official launch of Adult Swim, on September 9, 2001 with "Escape from Leprechaupolis", and ended with "Cybernetic Ghost of Christmas Past from the Future" on December 29, 2002, with a total of eighteen episodes. Aqua Teen Hunger Force is about the surreal adventures and antics of three anthropomorphic fast food items: Master Shake, Frylock, and Meatwad, who live together as roommates and frequently interact with their human next-door neighbor, Carl Brutananadilewski in a suburban neighborhood in South New Jersey. In late March 2013, this season became available on Netflix. In May 2015, this season became available on Hulu Plus. In May 2020, this season became available on HBO Max.

Season one marks the first appearance of the main characters, and several recurring characters as well. Episodes in season one were written and directed by Dave Willis and Matt Maiellaro. Almost every episode in this season features a special guest appearance, which is later continued in later seasons. This season has been made available on DVD, and other forms of home media, including on demand streaming.

Production
All episodes in season one were written and directed by series creators Dave Willis and Matt Maiellaro. The first episode from this season, "Rabbot" originally aired in the United States on Cartoon Network, unannounced, on December 30, 2000. The remaining episodes from this season originally aired on Cartoon Network's late night programming block, Adult Swim. As with most seasons, several episodes aired outside of their production order. This season was one of the original seasons produced under the Aqua Teen Hunger Force title before Willis and Maiellaro started using alternative titles for each season in 2011.

Season one marks the first official appearances of Master Shake, Frylock, and Meatwad, who originated from the then-unproduced Space Ghost Coast to Coast episode "Baffler Meal" which features their intended designs and personalities. This season also marks the first appearance of their next door neighbor, Carl Brutananadilewski, as well as a number of recurring characters such as Dr. Weird, Steve, Ignignokt, Err, Oglethorpe, Emory, MC Pee Pants, Cybernetic Ghost of Christmas Past from the Future, and George Lowe.

The first three episodes of season one feature Master Shake, Frylock, and Meatwad as detectives. After three episodes, this premise and the use of the name by the characters were dropped. The premise was a trick that had been added to appease Cartoon Network executives, who "didn't want to air a show about food just going around and doing random stuff". In the show itself, Frylock mentions that they stopped fighting crime because "that wasn't making us a whole lot of money". This premise was later revisited in the season eight two-part episode "Allen"

Cast

In season one the main cast debuted consisting of Dana Snyder who provided the voice of Master Shake, Carey Means who provided the voice of Frylock, and series co-creator Dave Willis who provided the voice of both Meatwad and Carl Brutananadilewski; and recurring character Ignignokt. Season one also featured appearances from recurring voice cast members such as C. Martin Croker who voiced both Dr. Weird and Steve in the cold openings, Matt Maiellaro who voiced Err and Cybernetic Ghost of Christmas Past from the Future, George Lowe who voiced himself as various characters, MC Chris who voiced McPee Pants, Andy Merrill who voiced Oglethorpe and Merle, and Mike Schatz who voiced Emory. 

Season one also features many guest appearances. Scott Hilley provided the voice of Flargon in "Escape from Leprechaupolis". H. Jon Benjamin voiced Mothmonsterman, and Don Kennedy and Mary Kraft made live action cameos in "Bus of the Undead". Ol' Drippy was voiced by Todd Field in "Ol' Drippy". David Cross voiced Happy Time Harry in "Dumber Dolls", and Matt Harrigan voiced Major Shake in "Bad Replicant". Love Mummy was voiced by Tom Clark in "Love Mummy", and Todd Hanson played Wwwyzzerdd in "Interfection". "PDA" featured Todd Barry as Romulox and Vishal Roney an Insurance Adjuster. Rita McGrath voiced Svetlana in "Mail Order Bride", and Glenn Danzig voiced Danzig in "Cybernetic Ghost of Christmas Past from the Future".

Broadcast history
An unfinished version of "Rabbot" originally aired unannounced at 5:00 am on December 30, 2000 on Cartoon Network, several months before the official launch of Adult Swim. The version that aired on December 30, 2000 featured scenes from the original pitch pilot but were eventually cut from the official version of the episode. Unlike the original version of the pilot, the December 30, 2000 airing was more and rendered completely. "Rabbot" was not re aired until the final cut made its official television debut on September 16, 2001 on Adult Swim in the United States, only three weeks after Adult Swim launched on September 2, 2001. The series had already made its official television debut a week earlier with the second episode "Escape from Leprechaupolis" on September 9, 2001.

Episodes

Home release

A sampler disc that was paired with Space Ghost Coast to Coast was given to less than 50,000 people at the 2003 San Diego Comic Con featuring the episode Mayhem of the Mooninites but it was labeled as just  Mooninites.
The first sixteen episodes from season one were released on the Aqua Teen Hunger Force Volume One DVD on November 18, 2003. The remaining episodes, "Mail-Order Bride" and "Cybernetic Ghost of Christmas Past from the Future" were released, along with eleven episodes from season two, on the Aqua Teen Hunger Force Volume Two DVD on July 20, 2004. Both sets were distributed by Adult Swim and Warner Home Video and feature various special features including an early version of "Rabbot" and commentaries and deleted scenes on select episodes. Both sets were later released in Region 4 by Madman Entertainment on April 4, 2007 and November 7, 2007 respectively. The Volume One set was eventually released in Region 2 on April 29, 2009, and the Volume Two set was released on December 7, 2009. The Volume Two set was also released as part of the Adult Swim in a Box set on October 27, 2009.

This season is also available on iTunes and the Xbox Live Marketplace. In the iTunes and Xbox Live releases "Mail Order-Bride" and "Cybernetic Ghost of Christmas Past from the Future" were listed as part of the second season. This season was also released on Amazon Video under the label "Volume One", with "Mail-Order Bride" and "Cybernetic Ghost of Christmas Past from the Future" released with the first part of the second season under the label "Volume Two".

See also
 "Rabbot"
 List of Aqua Teen Hunger Force episodes
 Aqua Teen Hunger Force

References

External links
 
 Aqua Teen Hunger Force at Adult Swim
 Aqua Teen Hunger Force season 1 at the Internet Movie Database

2001 American television seasons
2002 American television seasons
Aqua Teen Hunger Force seasons